Elrodoceras is a genus of armenoceratids, (Cephalopoda, Actinocerida), that grew fairly large, characterized by a straight shell, slightly curved at the apex, a siphuncle narrower than that of Armenoceras but with segments still wider than long, and an arched endosiphuncular canal system.

Elrodoceras, which comes from the Middle Silurian of North America and Europe, is a late armenoceratid and, according to Curt Teichert, 1964, a member of one of the two branches of the Armenoceratidae that also includes Armenoceras and Monocyrtoceras.

References

 Curt Teichert, 1964. Actinoceratoidea, Treatise on Invertebrate Paleontology, Part K. Geological Society of America and University of Kansas press.

Prehistoric nautiloid genera
Actinocerida
Paleozoic life of Manitoba
Paleozoic life of Nunavut
Paleozoic life of Quebec